Manginapudi Beach is located on the coast of Bay of Bengal, at a distance of  from Machilipatnam of the Indian state of Andhra Pradesh. The beach is maintained by the state tourism board, APTDC.

See also 
List of beaches in India

References 

Beaches of Andhra Pradesh
Geography of Krishna district